Kirkman can refer to:

People

 Kirkman (harpsichord makers), an English harpsichord-making family
 Alan Kirkman, English footballer
Allison Kirkman, New Zealand sociology academic
 Boone Kirkman, American Heavyweight boxer
 Christina Kirkman, American actress, comedian, and rapper.
 Ellen Kirkman, American mathematician.
 Francis Kirkman, 17th century literary figure
 Jen Kirkman (born 1974), American actor, writer and comedian
 Marshall Monroe Kirkman, authority on railways
 Norman Kirkman (1920–1995), an English footballer and football manager
 Blessed Richard Kirkman, martyr in York with William Lacy
 Rick Kirkman, cartoonist
 Robert Kirkman, comic book writer
 Roger Kirkman, American football player
 Sidney Kirkman, British Army general
 Terry Kirkman, musician
 Thomas Kirkman, mathematician
 Tim Kirkman, film maker
Tom Kirkman, fictional character
 William Kirkman, Australian cricketer

Places
In the United States:
 Kirkman, Iowa
 Kirkman House, Walla Walla, Washington